The Diocese of Corpus Christi is a Latin Church ecclesiastical territory, or diocese, of the Catholic Church in southern Texas in the United States.  

The Diocese of Corpus Christi is a suffragan diocese in the ecclesiastical province of the metropolitan Archdiocese of Galveston-Houston.

History

1690 to 1912 
The first Catholic mission in Texas, then part of the Spanish Empire, was San Francisco de los Tejas. It was founded by Franciscan Father Damián Massanet in 1690 in the Weches area. The priests left the mission after three years, then established a second mission, Nuestro Padre San Francisco de los Tejas. near present day Alto in 1716.

In 1839, after the 1836 founding of the Texas Republic, Pope Gregory XVI erected the prefecture apostolic of Texas, covering its present day area. The prefecture was elevated to a vicariate apostolic in 1846, the year that Texas became an American state. In 1874, Pope Pius IX established the Vicariate Apostolic of Brownsville, including all the settlements south of the Nueces River to the Rió Grande River.

1912 to 1949 
Pope Pius X suppressed the Apostolic Vicariate of Brownsville and erected the Diocese of Corpus Christi on March 23, 1912. He appointed Reverend Paul Nussbaum as its first bishop in 2013. As bishop, Nussbaum founded St. Ann's Society for married women, and promoted the Forty Hours' Devotion and daily communion. He also emphasized Catholic education and doubled the number of parochial schools in the diocese.  During his tenure, he welcomed into the diocese many Mexican priests and nuns who were forced to flee Mexico due to the Mexican Revolution.  He set up Duns Scots College in Hebbronville, Texas, to train seminarians for future service in Mexico. Nussbaum resigned as bishop in 1920 due to poor health.

In 1921, Reverend Emmanuel Ledvina of the Diocese of Indianapolis was appointed the second bishop of Corpus Christi by Pope Benedict XV. During his tenure, Ledvina increased the number of priests from 32 to 160, and erected over 50 churches, 53 mission chapels, and 47 rectories. He constructed Corpus Christi Cathedral in 1940, and a chancery office in 1947. He invited the Benedictine monks of Subiaco Abbey to establish a community in the diocese and staff a new high school. Ledvina also became known for his efforts among Mexican-American Catholics in South Texas and for his opposition to the Ku Klux Klan.In 1936, Pope Pius XI named Reverend Mariano Garriga of the Archdiocese of San Antonio as coadjutor bishop in Corpus Christi to assist Ledvina.

1949 to 1990 
After Ledvina retired for health reasons in 1949, Garriga automatically succeeded him as bishop of Corpus Christi. He was the first Texas native to be named bishop of a Texas diocese. During his 16 year tenure, Garriga founded a minor seminary in 1960 and established several parochial schools. Garriga died in 1965.

On July 19, 1965, Bishop Thomas Joseph Drury of the Diocese of San Angelo was appointed bishop of Corpus Christi by Pope Paul VI. Earlier that month, the pope erected the Diocese of Brownsville, removing its territory from the Diocese of Corpus Christ.

Drury expanded diocesan activities from two to thirty-two departments, including Catholic Charities, the Office of Catholic Schools, the Catholic Youth Organization, and the Department of Hispanic Affairs. Drury created a Diocesan Pastoral Council to advise him on current issues in the diocese. He also established a weekly newspaper, Texas Gulf Coast Register, in 1966; it was later known as Texas Gulf Coast Catholic. Today the newspaper is the official diocese newspaper called South Texas Catholic.

After Drury retired in 1983, Pope John Paul II appointed Bishop René Gracida of the Diocese of Pensacola-Tallahassee as his replacement.  In June 1990, Gracida excommunicated two parishioners in the diocese who were providing legal abortion services for women, citing canon law. They were Rachel Vargas, a women's health clinic director, and Dr. Eduardo Aquino, an obstetrician. In an interview, Aquino noted that he had recently won a $800,000 legal settlement against the anti-abortion group South Texas for Life, whose protestors had been picketing his house. Vargas ran her clinic for eight years and did not receive any notices from Gracida until she was interviewed on local television. In 1995, Auxiliary Bishop Roberto Nieves of the Archdiocese of Boston was appointed coadjutor bishop of the diocese by John Paul II to assist Gracida.

1990 to present 
Gracida retired in 1997, allowing Nieves to automatically become bishop of Corpus Christi. John Paul II named him in 1999 as bishop of the Archdiocese of San Juan. To replace Nieves, John Paul II appointed Bishop Edmond Carmody of the Diocese of Tyler as bishop of Corpus Christi. Carmody retired in 2009.

The current bishop of Corpus Christi is Michael Mulvey of the Diocese of Austin.  He was named by Pope Benedict XVI in 2010.

Sex abuse 
Bishop Gracida and the Diocese of Corpus Christi were sued in 1988 by a couple who claimed that John J. Feminelli, a diocese priest, had engaged in private "wrestling matches" with their teenage son. The couple claimed that diocese officials slandered the boy, prompting him to recant his testimony in a court case.In 1995, Reverend Jesús Hernando, a diocesan priest, was indicted for sexual assault and indecency with an altar boy in 1982. The criminal case was dismissed due to lack of evidence.

In 2019, Bishop Mulvey released a list of 20 diocesan clergy with credible accusations of sexual abuse of minors.  Later that year, three priests on the list, including Ferminelli and Hernando, sued the diocese for defamation of character.

Bishops

Vicars Apostolic of Brownsville
 Dominic Manucy (1874-1884)  - John Claude Neraz, Bishop of San Antonio, Apostolic Administrator, 1887 to 1890
 Peter Verdaguer y Prat (1890-1911)

Bishops of Corpus Christi
 Paul Joseph Nussbaum (1913-1920), appointed Bishop of Saulte Sainte Marie-Marquette
 Emmanuel Boleslaus Ledvina (1921-1949)
 Mariano Simon Garriga (1949-1965; Coadjutor 1936–1949)
 Thomas Joseph Drury (1965-1983)
 René Henry Gracida (1983-1997)
 Roberto González Nieves (1997-1999; Coadjutor 1995–1997), appointed Archbishop of San Juan in Puerto Rico
 Edmond Carmody (2000-2010)
 William Mulvey (2010–present)

Former Auxiliary Bishop of Corpus Christi
 Adolph Marx (1956-1965), appointed Bishop of Brownsville

Other diocesan priests who became bishops
Raymundo Joseph Peña, appointed Auxiliary Bishop of San Antonio in 1976 and later Bishop of El Paso and Bishop of Brownsville
James Anthony Tamayo, appointed Auxiliary Bishop of Galveston-Houston in 1993 and later Bishop of Laredo
Daniel Edward Flores, appointed Auxiliary Bishop of Detroit in 2006 and later Bishop of Brownsville
Louis Frederick Kihneman, appointed Bishop of Biloxi in 2016

Education

High schools
Incarnate Word Academy, Corpus Christi
St. John Paul II High School, Corpus Christi

Radio
KLUX

See also

 Catholic Church by country
 Catholic Church in the United States
 Ecclesiastical Province of Galveston-Houston
 Global organisation of the Catholic Church
 List of Roman Catholic archdioceses (by country and continent)
 List of Roman Catholic dioceses (alphabetical) (including archdioceses)
 List of Roman Catholic dioceses (structured view) (including archdioceses)
 List of the Catholic dioceses of the United States

References

External links 
Roman Catholic Diocese of Corpus Christi Official Site 

 
Corpus Christi
Christian organizations established in 1912
Corpus Christi
Corpus Christi
1912 establishments in Texas